Balouch or Baloch is a Tehsil in Sudhanoti District, Azad Kashmir. It is the highest most peak in Sudhnoti district parallel to but not in balanced surface proportion with the Bisarh'i peak. The third peak is Baithak. It is located at 33°38'40N 73°49'25E with an altitude of 1769 metres (5804 feet). 

Nearby villages include Berry, Upper Keemar, Lower Keemar, Norsa, Upper Kahala, Lower Kahala, Kanjeri, Saran, and Manjhari Dhamman, Phukotar.

The Pir Panjal range is visible from the town and if a person hikes up to Irh'iryari. In winter, tourists gather in the area. It receives annual snowfall. Mainly it is in the month of January when snowstorms come.

The majority of the population in this area is Muslim, almost 99 percent. It is in the south of Sudhnoti district. 3G and 4G internet service is available in Balouch and surrounding areas.

There are two major shrines in Baloch area. One is of the Noshahi order Sufi Ghulam Muhammad Qadri Noshahi and the other is on the east of Baloch named Sain Chall'ha Darbar or sometimes Jhandiyaan.

Further reading
 Gazetteer of Kashmir & Ladakh (1890)
 Tribes & Castes of Punjab & North West Frontier Province by Ebbetson. 
 The Sudhan Revolt (The News 19 October 1997.) By Sardar M. Saleem Khan.

References

External links
Government of Azad Jammu and Kashmir

Britannica - Azad Kashmir

Populated places in Sudhanoti District